Bogside Moor Halt railway station was a railway station near the town of Irvine, North Ayrshire, Scotland. The station was part of the Lanarkshire and Ayrshire Railway.

History

Located adjacent to the Cadgers' Racecourse on the town moor, this station was open for restricted used by 1893 as Bogside Platform. It was renamed Bogside and opened to the general public sometime before September 1909. The station closed between 1 January 1917 and 1 February 1919 due to wartime economy, and upon the grouping of the L&AR into the London, Midland and Scottish Railway in 1923 it was renamed Bogside Moor Halt on 2 June 1924. Trains only called at this station upon request.  The station closed to passengers on 28 July 1930, but the line saw use for freight trains going to Irvine until 1939.

No trace of this station exists today.

References

Notes

Sources 
 
 
 Wark, Hugh, Webster, John and Higgins, Michael (1972). "Glimpses of a Caledonian Branch". In The Railway Magazine, Volume 118, No. 851. Pages 128 - 131. (March 1972).

Disused railway stations in North Ayrshire
Former Caledonian Railway stations
Railway stations in Great Britain opened in 1893
Railway stations in Great Britain closed in 1917
Railway stations in Great Britain opened in 1919
Railway stations in Great Britain closed in 1930
Irvine, North Ayrshire